Canger is a surname. Notable people with the surname include:

Joseph Canger (born 1956), American artist
Una Canger (born 1938), Danish linguist

See also
Ranger (surname)